Andreas Darmarios or Darmarius (1540 - after 1586) was a copyist and book trader based in Venice.

Aubrey Diller reports in the second paragraph on page 127 in "Two Greek Forgeries of the Sixteenth Century" that his last name was Darmarius and that he was born around 1560 and died in 1586.

References

1540 births
Year of death unknown
Italian scribes
16th-century scholars